Poropuntius exiguus is a species of ray-finned fish in the genus Poropuntius that is endemic to Lake Erhai in China. It has not been recorded since the 1970s and it is possibly extinct.

References 

exiguus
Taxa named by Wu Hsien-Wen
Taxa named by Lin Ren-Duan
Fish described in 1977